Shell River, formerly Shell Brook, is a river in the north-central region of the Canadian province of Saskatchewan. The river begins at Big Shell Lake and travels in an easterly direction and flows into the Sturgeon River north of the city of Prince Albert. The upper reaches of its watershed are as far west as the Thickwood Hills.

Course 
Shell River begins in the RM of Spiritwood No. 496 at the north end of Big Shell Lake and flows north for about three kilometres before emptying into Little Shell Lake. From Little Shell Lake, the river carries on north-east past Memorial Lake Regional Park and the village of Shell Lake. From Shell Lake, the Shell River heads north towards Big River 118A Indian reserve and then loops back down south passing through Ahtahkakoop 104 Indian reserve where it begins heading in an eastward direction. Along this leg of the route, it is joined by several tributaries, enters the RM of Shellbrook No. 493, and passes by the community of Shellbrook, which took its name from the river. From Shellbrook, Shell River continues eastward and meets with the Sturgeon River in the RM of Buckland No. 491. The Sturgeon River carries on southward and joins the North Saskatchewan River on the west side of Prince Albert.

Tributaries 
The following are the tributaries of Shell River from its headwaters at Shell Lake to its mouth at Sturgeon River:
Mistowasis Creek
Tippicanoe Creek
Vant Creek
Sucker Creek

See also 
List of rivers of Saskatchewan
Hudson Bay drainage basin

References 

Rivers of Saskatchewan
Tributaries of Hudson Bay
North Saskatchewan River
Spiritwood No. 496, Saskatchewan
Shellbrook No. 493, Saskatchewan
Buckland No. 491, Saskatchewan